The Lorelei is a rock in the Rhine River, the subject of numerous legends, poems, and songs about maritime disaster.

Lorelei, Loralei, Loreley, Lorelai, or Lorilei may also refer to:

Film and stage
Lorelei Lee, a character in the 1925 novel Gentlemen Prefer Blondes (novel). This may also refer to:
Gentlemen Prefer Blondes (musical), the 1949 stage musical, in which the character is portrayed by Carol Channing
Gentlemen Prefer Blondes (1953 film), the 1953 film, in which the character is portrayed by Marilyn Monroe
The Lorelei (1927 film), a German silent film
Lorelei (film), a 2020 American drama film
Lorelei (musical), 1974 revision of Gentlemen Prefer Blondes
Lorelei: The Witch of the Pacific Ocean, a 2005 Japanese film
Lorelei, a character in the 2015 film Victor Frankenstein
Lorilei, a 2005 play by Tom Wright

Comics
Lorelei (Asgardian), a character appearing mostly in The Mighty Thor and on Marvel's Agents of S.H.I.E.L.D.
Lorelei (Mutate), a character whose first appearance was in X-Men #63
Mantis (Marvel Comics), who briefly took the name Lorelei

Literature
Lorelei, a 1935 romance novel by Ionel Teodoreanu
"Die Lore-Ley", an 1824 poem by Heinrich Heine, set to music by Friedrich Silcher in 1837
"Lorelei", a poem by Sylvia Plath
Lorelei, a dog character from The Dogs of Babel

Music

Artists
Lorelei (band), a dark rock band from Pittsburgh

Classical
Loreley (opera), an 1890 opera by Alfredo Catalani
Die Loreley (Bruch), an 1862 opera
"Die Lorelei", an 1837 German folk song by Friedrich Silcher
"Lorelei", an 1843 Lied by Clara Schumann
"Die Loreley", an 1856 song by Franz Liszt

Songs
"Lorelei" (George Gershwin song) (1933)
"Lorelei" (Styx song) (1976)
"Loreley", a 2003 song by Blackmore's Night from Ghost of a Rose
"Lorelei", a 2018 song by Clutch from Book of Bad Decisions
"Lorelei", a 1984 song by Cocteau Twins from Treasure
"Lorelei", a 2003 song by Comeback Kid from Turn It Around
"Lorelei", a 1993 song by Corpus Delicti from Twilight
"Lorelei", a 2019 song by DIIV from Deceiver
"Lorelei", a 1960 song by Lonnie Donegan
"Lorelai", a 2011 song by Fleet Foxes from Helplessness Blues
"Laurelei", a 1995 song by Lisa Gerrard from The Mirror Pool
"Lorelei", a 1983 song by Nina Hagen from Angstlos
"Loreley", a 1981 song by Dschinghis Khan
"Lorelei", a 2013 song by Steve Kilbey and Martin Kennedy from You Are Everything
"Lorelei", a 1984 song by The Explorers from The Explorers
"Lorelei", a 2016 track by Ladies' Code from STRANG3R
"Loreley", a 1998 song by L'Arc-en-Ciel from Heart
"Loreley", a 2018 song by Lord of the Lost from Thornstar
"Black Forest (Lorelei)", a 2005 song by Mercury Rev from The Secret Migration
"Lorelei", a 1989 song by the Pogues from Peace and Love
"Lorelei", a 2010 song by Scorpions from Sting in the Tail
"Lorelei", a 1998 song by Theatre of Tragedy from Aégis
"Lorelei", a 1981 song by Tom Tom Club from Tom Tom Club
"Lorelei", a 1976 song by Wishbone Ash from New England
"Lorelei", the title track for the character named Ilyasviel from the visual novel Fate/stay night

Places
Lorelei, Edmonton, a neighbourhood in Edmonton, Alberta, Canada
Loreley (Verbandsgemeinde), a Verbandsgemeinde ("collective municipality") in Rhineland-Palatinate, Germany
Loralai District, Balochistan, Pakistan
Loralai, the principal city of Loralai District

Video games
Lorelai (Suikoden), a character in the Suikoden video game series
Lorelei (Pokémon), a character from the Pokémon video games
Lorelei, a character from the Borderlands 3 video game
Lorelai, a sequel to The Cat Lady
Order of Lorelei, a fictional military-religious organization in Tales of the Abyss
Lorelai, a character from Vainglory

Other uses
Lorelei (name), a feminine given name
165 Loreley, an asteroid discovered by C. H. F. Peters in 1876
María Luisa Garza (1887–1980), a Mexican writer who wrote under the pen name Lorelay
The Lorelei Signal, an episode of the animated series of Star Trek

See also
Loreleia, a mushroom genus
 Mermaid
 Siren (mythology)